Wickham Island may refer to a number of places named after John Clements Wickham:

Australia
Two islands in Western Australia:
 Wickham Island (Kimberley coast), an island in the Timor Sea
 Wickham Island (Recherche Archipelago), an island off the south coast of WA

Chile
 Wickham Island (Chile)

Solomon Islands
 an island in the New Georgia Islands group